Ewa Piątkowska (born June 24, 1980) is a Polish volleyball player.

Sporting achievements

Clubs 
Belgian Championship:
  2006, 2008
  2010, 2012
Belgian Cup:
  2008, 2012, 2013

References

External links
 Women.Volleybox profile
 CEV profile

1980 births
Sportspeople from Ruda Śląska
Living people
Polish women's volleyball players
Expatriate volleyball players in Belgium
Czech expatriate sportspeople in Belgium